Curtis Lovejoy (May 13, 1957 – March 11, 2021) was an American Paralympic swimmer. In 2000, he won the gold medal in the men's 50 metre freestyle S2 and the men's 100 metre freestyle S2 events at the 2000 Summer Paralympics held in Sydney, Australia. He also won two medals in swimming at the 2004 Summer Paralympics held in Athens, Greece. He also competed in wheelchair fencing.

Early life 

In 1986, he was paralyzed from the neck down after a car accident. He took up swimming as therapy after his accident.

Career 

In 2009, he won the gold medal in the men's 50 metre freestyle S3 event at the 2009 IPC Swimming World Championships 25 m held in Rio de Janeiro, Brazil with a new world record of 55.77s. He also won the bronze medal in the men's 4×50 m freestyle relay 20 pts event. He was inducted into the Georgia Aquatics Hall of Fame in 2013.

In 2015, he competed in swimming at the Parapan American Games held in Toronto, Canada. He won the silver medal in the mixed 4 x 50 metre freestyle relay 20pts event. He was also the flag bearer for the United States during the opening ceremony of the 2015 Parapan American Games. In 2019, he was inducted into the Atlanta Sports Hall of Fame.

He died on March 11, 2021. He retired earlier in 2021 after being diagnosed with a form of blood cancer.

References

External links 
 

1957 births
2021 deaths
Swimmers from Atlanta
Deaths from blood cancer
Wheelchair fencers
American male backstroke swimmers
American male freestyle swimmers
Swimmers at the 2000 Summer Paralympics
Swimmers at the 2004 Summer Paralympics
Swimmers at the 2008 Summer Paralympics
Swimmers at the 2012 Summer Paralympics
Paralympic gold medalists for the United States
Paralympic silver medalists for the United States
Paralympic bronze medalists for the United States
Paralympic medalists in swimming
Paralympic swimmers of the United States
Medalists at the 2000 Summer Paralympics
Medalists at the 2004 Summer Paralympics
Medalists at the 2015 Parapan American Games
Medalists at the World Para Swimming Championships
S2-classified Paralympic swimmers
20th-century American people
21st-century American people